Qau, Central Gelao, or Sinicized Gelao is a Gelao language spoken in Guizhou, China.

Dialects
The dialects of Qau that are still spoken are:
Dagouchang 大狗场 (in Pingba County)
Wanzi 湾子 (in Anshun City)

Pronouns
The following are pronouns from Pingba Gelao.

()  – I
()  - you
()  - he, she, it
()  - we
()  - you all
 - they
 - my household
 - your household
 - his/her household

Numerals
Pingba Gelao numerals are given below. Note the similarities with the Austronesian numeral system.

References

Kra languages
Languages of China